Brown House may refer to:

United States
(sorted by state then city/town)

Dr. A.M. Brown House, Birmingham, Alabama
Brown–Proctor House, Scottsboro, Alabama
Brown House (Bald Knob, Arkansas)
Brown House (Conway, Arkansas)
Earl and Oza Crownover-Brown House, Damascus, Arkansas
W. C. Brown House, Hot Springs, Arkansas
Floyd B. Brown House, Pine Bluff, Arkansas
Alfrey-Brown House, Siloam Springs, Arkansas
Dr. Charles Fox Brown House, Van Buren, Arkansas
Joe Brown House and Farmstead, White County, Arkansas
Duff T. Brown House, Kingman, Arizona
Brown House (Yuma, Arizona)
Jackson Fay Brown House, Dixon, California
Ennis House, Los Angeles, California, also known as the Ennis-Brown House
Molly Brown House, Denver, Colorado
David W. Brown House, Englewood, Colorado
Lawrence Brown House, Bartow, Florida
Brown House (McDonough, Georgia), listed on the National Register of Historic Places (NRHP)
Roger Brown Home and Studio, Chicago, Illinois, listed on the NRHP
David Brown House, Ohio County, Indiana
Blankenship-Hodges-Brown House, Ray Township, Indiana
Brown-Kercheval House, Rockport, Indiana
Corydon Brown House, Dakota City, Iowa
Brown House (Hodgenville, Kentucky), listed on the NRHP
Theodore Brown House, St. Matthews, Kentucky
Brown House (Brownville, Maine)
Brown-Pilsbury Double House, Bucksport, Maine
Harrison B. Brown House, Portland, Maine
Moses Brown House, Eldersburg, Maryland
Jeremiah Brown House and Mill Site, Rising Sun, Maryland
Mercer Brown House, Rising Sun, Maryland
Colonel Roger Brown House, Concord, Massachusetts
Reuben Brown House, Concord, Massachusetts
Austin Brown House, Hamilton, Massachusetts
Brown House (Hamilton, Massachusetts)
Brown–Maynard House, Lowell, Massachusetts
Brown–Hodgkinson House, Quincy, Massachusetts
Brown House (Rehoboth, Massachusetts)
Brown–Stow House, Stow, Massachusetts
E. Brown House, Uxbridge, Massachusetts
Brown-Price House, Lansing, Michigan, listed on the NRHP
Joseph Brown House Ruins, Renville County, Minnesota
Robert A. Brown House, Cass County, Missouri
Doerr–Brown House, Perryville, Missouri
Thompson-Brown-Sandusky House, St. Joseph, Missouri
Hugh H. Brown House, Nye County, Nevada
Brown–Ellis House, Highland, New York
Luke Brown House, Parishville, New York
Alexander Brown House, Syracuse, New York
Brown-Graves House and Brown's Store, Caswell County, North Carolina
Wiley and Jane Vann Brown House, Hertford County, North Carolina
Brown-Cowles House and Cowles Law Office, Wilkesboro, North Carolina
Stephen William Brown Stone House, Stutsman County, North Dakota
Jim Brown House, Peninsula, Ohio
Charles and Martha Brown House, Marion County, Oregon, listed on the NRHP
Childs–Brown House, Pawtucket, Rhode Island
Morris Brown House, Providence, Rhode Island
Nightingale–Brown House, Providence, Rhode Island
Jennings-Brown House, Bennettsville, South Carolina
Brown-Evans House, Mobridge, South Dakota
A.R. Brown House, Erwin, Tennessee, NRHP-listed
Hamilton-Brown House, Franklin, Tennessee
Brown House (Ooltewah, Tennessee), listed on the NRHP
Brown-Daly-Horne House, Pulaski, Tennessee
Brown-Mann House, McGregor, Texas, formerly listed on the NRHP
Brooks–Brown House, Franklin County, Virginia
Brown–Koerner House, Loudoun County, Virginia
Williams–Brown House and Store, Salem, Virginia
Danforth Brown House, Brooke County, West Virginia
Dr. Flavius Brown House, Summersville, West Virginia
Brown-Sewell House, Stoughton, Wisconsin, listed on the NRHP
 Herbert Hoover's Presidential Brown House at Rapidan Camp

Elsewhere

Brown House, Munich, Germany, the headquarters of the former Nazi Party in Germany
 Brown House, Bocas del Toro, Panama, a hostel located at Isla Colon Town at Bocas del Toro Archipielago.

See also
George Brown House (disambiguation)
James Brown House (disambiguation)
John Brown House (disambiguation)
Samuel Brown House (disambiguation)
Thomas Brown House (disambiguation)
William Brown House (disambiguation)